Holy oils are used in religion and magic, and include:

 Holy anointing oil, to anoint priests and articles of the Jewish Tabernacle
 In Christianity:
 Chrism
 Oil of catechumens
 Holy oil from pilgrimage sites, see Monza ampullae
 Oil of the sick, used in the anointing of the sick
 Holy Oil of Aspiration, a ceremonial magic oil